Oksana Kalashnikova and Demi Schuurs were the defending champions, but Schuurs chose to compete in Gstaad instead. Kalashnikova played alongside Yaroslava Shvedova, but lost in the quarterfinals to Lenka Kunčíková and Karolína Stuchlá.

Jessica Moore and Varatchaya Wongteanchai won the title, defeating Alexandra Cadanțu and Katarzyna Piter in the final, 6–3, 7–6(7–5).

Seeds

Draw

References 
 Draw

2016 WTA Tour
2016 Doubles